Sinsa-dong is a dong, neighbourhood of Eunpyeong-gu in Seoul, South Korea.

See also 
Administrative divisions of South Korea

References

External links
Eunpyeong-gu official website 
Eunpyeong-gu map at the Eunpyeong-gu official website  

Neighbourhoods of Eunpyeong District